The 719th Infantry Division was a German Army division of World War II.

It was founded in early May 1941 and spent most of World War II stationed in the Netherlands and Antwerp until the Allied invasion of Normandy.  The 719th fought in several defensive battles until being destroyed in April 1945.

History
The Division was formed on 3 May 1941 as part of the fifteenth Aufstellungswelle. In an order dated 13 April 1941, each military district had been required to raise two regiment for a total of thirty. The 719th Division consisted of the two regiments raised in Wehrkreis III (Berlin). These were the Infantry Regiments 723 and 743. Like the other divisions of the fifteenth wave, the 719th division consisted of only two rather than three infantry regiments.

The 719th Division was transferred to occupation activity in the Netherlands. Until July 1942 the division was part of the Command of the German Troops in the Netherlands.  In July 1942 it was transferred to LXXXVIII Korps, Niederlande Armee, Armeegruppe D.  The LXXXVIII Korps was transferred to Armeegruppe B in May 1944.  The division remained there until 7 September 1944 when it was transferred to Antwerp as part of the LXXXVIII Korps, 1. Fsch Armee, Armeegruppe B. This move was to prepare for the Allied advance.  Within a month, the division was again transferred to LXVII Korps, 15. Armee, Armeegruppe B, active in the Netherlands. It fought at Fort Merksem, Woensdrecht, Breda before being transferred to the Saarpfalz region in February 1945. In the Saarpfalz, the division was a part of LXXXV Korps, 1. Armee, Armeegruppe G.  It fought at Œting at Saarlautern and in the Palatinate region before being destroyed. It is possible that the Division zbV 405 a small unit (zbV, German zur besonderen Verwendung indicates a special purpose unit, often very small), may have been reformed as 719th Division.  If so, this unit would have been too small and unorganized to have had any significance at the end of the war.

The remnants of the 719th surrendered to the United States Army in early May 1945 near Münsingen in Baden-Württemberg.

Organization

1941
 Infanterie-Regiment 723
 Infanterie-Regiment 743
 Artillerie-Abteilung 663
 Aufklärungs-Kompanie 719
 Panzerjäger-Kompanie 719
 Pionier-Kompanie 719
 Nachrichten-Kompanie 719

1944
 Grenadier-Regiment 723
 Grenadier-Regiment 743
 Grenadier-Regiment 766
 Artillerie-Regiment 1719
 Divisions-Füsilier-Bataillon 719
 Panzerjäger-Abteilung 719
 Pionier-Bataillon 719
 Nachrichten-Abteiliung 719
 Sanitäts-Abteilung 719
 Feldersatz-Bataillon 719

References

Citations

Bibliography 

 
 

Military units and formations established in 1941
Military units and formations disestablished in 1945
Infantry divisions of Germany during World War II